Samira Denise Wiley (born April 15, 1987) is an American actress. She is best known for her starring role as Poussey Washington in the Netflix comedy-drama series Orange Is the New Black (2013–2019) and as Moira in the Hulu dystopian drama series The Handmaid's Tale (2017–present), for which she won the Primetime Emmy Award for Outstanding Guest Actress in a Drama Series.

Wiley also had starring roles in such film as The Sitter (2011), Nerve (2016), Detroit (2017), and Social Animals (2018). She also narrated the Netflix documentary Night on Earth (2020).

Early life
Wiley was raised in Washington, D.C.  Her parents, Christine and Dennis W. Wiley, were the co-pastors of Covenant Baptist United Church of Christ until 2017. Wiley's parents have been referred to as "pillars of the LGBT religious community," as the Covenant Baptist Church was the only Baptist church in D.C. performing same-sex unions in 2007. She has two siblings: Aiyana Ma'at and Joshua Wiley.

Wiley attended the Duke Ellington School of the Arts in Washington, D.C., and the Juilliard School in New York City, graduating in 2010. At Juilliard, she trained in theater performance and worked mainly in theater in her early career.

Career
Wiley's first major acting role was in the comedy film The Sitter (2011). In 2011, Wiley played Maria in a theater production of Love's Labour's Lost by The Public Theater.

When the Netflix television series Orange Is the New Black —based on Piper Kerman's memoir of the same name— came into development, Wiley was told about the auditions by a friend from Juilliard, Marco Ramirez, who was a writer for the show. After discovering that another Juilliard friend, Danielle Brooks, had won a role in the show, Wiley asked Brooks to rehearse lines with her to prepare for her audition for the role of Poussey Washington, the on-screen best friend of Brooks' character. Wiley's audition was ultimately successful; she appeared in all twelve episodes of the series' first season and was featured prominently throughout the second season. The darker and more violent plot of the second season allowed for the growth of Wiley's character, whose evolved story lines led to Wiley's prolonged screen exposure and ultimate development as a "fan-favorite." She was promoted to series regular for the third season. The fourth season revolves heavily around her character, leading up to the reactions within the prison upon Poussey's death at the hands of a prison officer. Wiley's wife, Lauren Morelli, is a writer on the show.

In between seasons of Orange Is the New Black, Wiley filmed Rob the Mob (2014), an independent crime film directed by Raymond De Felitta. She appeared in an advertisement for the digital monetary service PayPal in 2014. In 2015, Wiley featured in the 21st episode of the 16th season of Law & Order: Special Victims Unit, "Perverted Justice", portraying a young adult wishing to recant her rape accusation of her father when she was 6 years old, and set him free. In December 2015, it was announced Wiley had been cast to voice the titular character in the video game The Walking Dead: Michonne. The game was released by Telltale Games in February 2016. In 2017, she narrated one of two versions of Max Brooks' book, Minecraft: The Island: A Novel.  Wiley also starred in a film called 37 (2016), a true story of thirty-seven people who witness a murder and none call the police or intervene. In 2016, she starred in a new play by Quiara Alegría Hudes called Daphne's Dive.

She competed against New Black co-star Laverne Cox in an episode of Spike's Lip Sync Battle. With performances of "Un-Break My Heart" by Toni Braxton and "O.P.P." by Naughty by Nature, Wiley emerged victorious.

Wiley was featured in Maniac Magazine, appearing on the cover and in an editorial of the 2014 September/October issue displaying "a series of bold, chic, high fashion looks." She was also featured on the cover of 2014 edition of Out magazine, along with Sam Smith, Elliot Page, and Zachary Quinto.

Awards 
In 2014, Wiley was named Out magazine's Ingenue of the Year. In February 2015, she was awarded the Human Rights Campaign's Visibility Award. According to the Human Rights Campaign's website, Wiley was always accepted and embraced by her parents, regardless of her sexuality, and to this she attributes her success.

In 2017, Wiley received an Emmy Award nomination for Outstanding Supporting Actress in a Drama Series for her role in the Hulu series The Handmaid's Tale, going on to win Outstanding Guest Actress in a Drama Series the following year.

In November 2017, Wiley was nominated to Out magazine's "OUT100" for 2017 in recognition of her work and her visibility.

Personal life
On October 4, 2016, Wiley announced her engagement to Orange Is the New Black writer Lauren Morelli and they married on March 25, 2017. Morelli gave birth to their first child, a daughter named George Elizabeth, on April 11, 2021.

Filmography

Film

Television

Video game

See also
 LGBT culture in New York City
 List of LGBT people from New York City

References

External links
 

1987 births
21st-century American actresses
Actresses from Washington, D.C.
African-American actresses
American film actresses
American stage actresses
American television actresses
Juilliard School alumni
LGBT African Americans
American LGBT actors
LGBT people from Washington, D.C.
LGBT actresses
Living people
21st-century African-American women
21st-century African-American people
20th-century African-American people
20th-century African-American women